Richard Russell Riordan, Jr. (born June 5, 1964) is an American author, best known for writing the Percy Jackson & the Olympians series. Riordan's books have been translated into forty-two languages and sold more than thirty million copies in the United States. 20th Century Fox adapted the first two books of his Percy Jackson series as part of a series of films, while a Disney+ adaptation is in production. His books have spawned related media, such as graphic novels and short story collections.

Riordan's first full-length novel was Big Red Tequila, which became the first book in the Tres Navarre series. His big breakthrough was The Lightning Thief (2005), the first novel in the five-volume Percy Jackson and the Olympians series, which placed a group of modern-day adolescents in a Greco-Roman mythological setting. Since then, Riordan has written The Heroes of Olympus, a sequel to the Percy Jackson series; The Kane Chronicles, a trilogy of similar premise focusing on Egyptian mythology; and Magnus Chase and the Gods of Asgard, again a trilogy of similar premise focusing on Norse mythology. Riordan also helped Scholastic Press develop The 39 Clues series and its spinoffs, and penned its first book, The Maze of Bones. In 2021, he published Daughter of the Deep. His third standalone novel, The Sun and the Star, co-written with author Mark Oshiro, is set to be released on May 2, 2023.

Life and career

Riordan was born and raised in San Antonio, Texas. He graduated from Alamo Heights High School, and first attended the music program at North Texas State University, wanting to be a guitarist. He transferred to the University of Texas at Austin and studied English and History. He received his teaching certification in those subjects from the University of Texas at San Antonio. He taught English and Social Studies for eight years at Presidio Hill School in San Francisco.

Rick married Becky Riordan in 1985 on the couple's shared birthday. They have two sons, Haley and Patrick. They moved from San Antonio to Boston in June 2013, in conjunction with older son Haley starting college in Boston.

Riordan has created several successful book series. Tres Navarre, an adult mystery series about a Texas private eye, won the Shamus, Anthony, and Edgar Awards.

He conceived the idea for the Percy Jackson series as bedtime stories about ancient Greek heroes for his son Haley.
Haley had been diagnosed with ADHD and dyslexia, inspiring Riordan to make the titular protagonist hyperactive and dyslexic. Riordan published the first novel in the series, The Lightning Thief, in 2005. Four sequels followed, with the last, The Last Olympian, in 2009. Prior to Percy Jackson, Riordan had written the Tres Navarres series, a series of mystery novels for adult readers.

His Percy Jackson & the Olympians series features the titular twelve-year-old who discovers he is the modern-day son of the ancient Greek god Poseidon. 20th Century Fox purchased the film rights and released two feature film adaptations between 2010 and 2013. Following the success of Percy Jackson, Riordan created The Kane Chronicles, which features a modern-day Egyptian pantheon and two new sibling protagonists, Sadie and Carter Kane. Riordan also created a sequel series to Percy Jackson, The Heroes of Olympus.

Riordan also helped create the children's book series The 39 Clues. He authored several of its books, including The Maze of Bones, which topped The New York Times Best Seller list on September 28, 2008. He also wrote the introduction to the Puffin Classics edition of Roger Lancelyn Green's Tales of the Greek Heroes, in which he states that the book influenced him to write his Greek mythology series.

In 2022, Riordan co-wrote the pilot for the Percy Jackson and the Olympians series on Disney+ and is serving as an executive producer for the show. Disney had earlier acquired Fox in 2019, allowing it to gain the rights to adapt the Percy Jackson novels.

Awards
1998 Shamus Award for Best First PI Novel and Anthony Award for Best Paperback Original for Big Red Tequila
1999 Edgar Award for Best Paperback Original for The Widower's Two-Step
2008 Mark Twain Award for The Lightning Thief 
2009 Mark Twain Award for The Sea of Monsters
2009 Rebecca Caudill Award for The Lightning Thief 
2010 School Library Journal's Best Book for The Red Pyramid
2011 Children's Choice Book Awards: Author of the Year
2011 Children's Choice Book Awards: Fifth Grade to Sixth Grade Book of the Year for The Red Pyramid
2011 Wyoming Soaring Eagle Book Award for The Last Olympian
2011 Milner Award for Percy Jackson and the Olympians series
2012 Indian Paintbrush Award for The Red Pyramid
2013 Best Fiction Book for Children in Bulgaria for The Mark of Athena
2017 Stonewall Book Award for Children's literature for The Hammer of Thor

Bibliography

Percy Jackson & the Olympians

 The Lightning Thief (2005)
 The Sea of Monsters (2006)
 The Titan's Curse (2007)
 The Battle of the Labyrinth (2008)
 The Last Olympian (2009)
 The Chalice of the Gods (2023)

Related books
 The Demigod Files (2009)
 The Ultimate Guide (2010, in collaboration with Antonio Caparo, Philip Chidlow, and Keven Hays)
 Percy Jackson and the Singer of Apollo (2013; short story published in Guys Read)
 Percy Jackson's Greek Gods (2014, illustrations by John Rocco)
 Percy Jackson's Greek Heroes (2015, illustrations by John Rocco)
 Camp Half-Blood Confidential (2017)
 The Percy Jackson Coloring Book (2017, artwork by Keith Robinson)
 The Lightning Thief: Illustrated Edition (August 14, 2018, illustrated by John Rocco)

The Heroes of Olympus

 The Lost Hero (2010)
 The Son of Neptune (2011)
 The Mark of Athena (2012)
 The House of Hades (2013)
 The Blood of Olympus (2014)

Related books
 The Demigod Diaries (2012)
 Demigods of Olympus (2015, interactive e-book)

The Kane Chronicles

 The Red Pyramid (2010)
 The Throne of Fire (2011)
 The Serpent's Shadow (2012)

Related books
 Survival Guide (2012)
 Brooklyn House Magician's Manual (2018)

Demigods and Magicians
Published individually first, then as an anthology titled Demigods and Magicians in 2016.
 The Son of Sobek (2013)
 The Staff of Serapis (2014)
 The Crown of Ptolemy (2015)

Magnus Chase and the Gods of Asgard

 The Sword of Summer (2015)
 The Hammer of Thor (2016)
 The Ship of the Dead (2017)

Related books
 Hotel Valhalla: Guide to the Norse Worlds (2016)
 The Magnus Chase Coloring Book (August 14, 2018, artwork by Keith Robinson)
 9 from the Nine Worlds (October 2, 2018)

The Trials of Apollo

 The Hidden Oracle (2016)
 The Dark Prophecy (2017)
 The Burning Maze (2018)
 The Tyrant's Tomb (2019)
 The Tower of Nero (2020)

Related books
 Camp Jupiter Classified (2020)

Tres Navarre
 Big Red Tequila (1997)
 The Widower's Two-Step (1998)
 The Last King of Texas (2001)
 The Devil Went Down to Austin (2002)
 Southtown (2004)
 Mission Road (2005)
 Rebel Island (2008)

The 39 Clues

 The Maze of Bones (2008)
 Introduction to The 39 Clues: The Black Book of Buried Secrets (2010)
 Vespers Rising (2011, in collaboration with Peter Lerangis, Gordon Korman, and Jude Watson)

Graphic novels

Percy Jackson & the Olympians
 The Lightning Thief Graphic Novel (2010, in collaboration with Robert Venditti, Nate Powell, and Jose Villarrubia)
 The Sea of Monsters Graphic Novel (2013, in collaboration with Robert Venditti, Attila Futaki, and Tamas Gaspar)
 The Titan's Curse Graphic Novel (2013, in collaboration with Robert Venditti, Attila Futaki, and Gregory Guilhaumond)
 The Battle of Labyrinth Graphic Novel (2018, in collaboration with Robert Venditti, Orpheus Collar and Antoine Dode)
 The Last Olympian Graphic Novel (2019, in collaboration with Robert Venditti, Orpheus Collar and Antoine Dode)

The Kane Chronicles
 The Red Pyramid Graphic Novel (2012, adapted by Orpheus Collar)
 The Throne of Fire Graphic Novel (2015, adapted by Orpheus Collar)
 The Serpent's Shadow Graphic Novel (2017, adapted by Orpheus Collar))

The Heroes of Olympus
 The Lost Hero Graphic Novel (2014, in collaboration with Robert Venditti, Nate Powell, and Orpheus Collar)
 The Son of Neptune Graphic Novel (2017, in collaboration with Robert Venditti, Antoine Dode, and Orpheus Collar)

Standalone novels
 Cold Springs (2004)
 Daughter of the Deep (2021)
 The Sun and the Star (2023, in collaboration with Mark Oshiro)

Other

 Introduction to the anthology Tales of the Greek Heroes, Roger Lancelyn Green (2009)
 Introduction to the essay collection Demigods and Monsters (2009, 2013)

Rick Riordan Presents

In September 2016, Disney-Hyperion announced a new Rick Riordan imprint. The imprint is called "Rick Riordan Presents" and was launched in March 2018. It is headed by Riordan's editor, Stephanie Owens Lurie.

Lurie said that Riordan had been approached about an imprint several years ago but initially dismissed the idea because of his heavy workload. Later, he reported back that he had been "toying with the idea" and was "willing to go forward with a publishing line that was not a brand extension for his own work but a platform for Riordan to bring other great writers to the attention of his vast and loyal audience." She also said that the imprint planned to launch with two then undetermined books. "The point of making this announcement now is to get the word out about what we’re looking for.”

The imprint will not publish books written by Riordan, "whose role will be closer to curator". In an interview with the Iowa Gazette, Riordan said, "Instead of me writing all of the mythologies we are going to look for authors who already are writing about that stuff. If I feel like I can recommend them [to my readers] ... we’re going to have them out here in the spotlight." A focus will be placed on "diverse, mythology-based fiction by new, emerging, and under-represented authors". Lurie expressed hopes that the imprint will help satisfy Riordan fans without asking the author to write more than his usual two books a year.

Notes

References

Further reading
Art at Our Doorstep: San Antonio Writers and Artists featuring Riordan. Edited by Nan Cuba and Riley Robinson (Trinity University Press, 2008).

External links

Rick Riordan
1964 births
Alamo Heights High School alumni
American fantasy writers
Living people
People from San Antonio
University of Texas at Austin College of Liberal Arts alumni
Anthony Award winners
Shamus Award winners
20th-century American novelists
21st-century American novelists
American mystery novelists
American male novelists
20th-century American male writers
21st-century American male writers